Patle Pani is a village development committee in Bhojpur District in the Kosi Zone of eastern Nepal. At the time of the 1991 Nepal census it had a population of 3787 persons living in 743 individual households.

References

External links
UN map of the municipalities of Bhojpur District

Populated places in Bhojpur District, Nepal